Callochiton kapitiensis is a species of chiton in the family Callochitonidae.

References
 Powell A. W. B., New Zealand Mollusca, William Collins Publishers Ltd, Auckland, New Zealand 1979 
 Transactions and Proceedings of the Royal Society of New Zealand 1868-1961

Callochitonidae
Chitons of New Zealand
Molluscs described in 1926